Jelena Ćulafić (born 8 June 1989) is Montenegrin basketball player.

External links
Profile at eurobasket.com

1989 births
Living people
People from Berane
Montenegrin women's basketball players
Shooting guards
ŽKK Šumadija Kragujevac players
ŽKK Partizan players